Ross Wilson (born 5 June 1995) is a British paralympic table tennis player.

He competed at the 2011 European Championships in Split, Croatia, winning silver and gained another silver medal at the 2011 Bayreuth Open, Bayreuth, Germany, competing in the men's singles class 8. He has also been a two-time national doubles champion in non-disabled competition. In the 2012 Summer Paralympics he won a bronze medal in the men's team class 6–8.

Personal life
Wilson was born in Minster, Kent. He has a genetic condition that affects his bones and their growth.

References

External links
 
 
 
 

1995 births
Living people
English male table tennis players
People from Minster-in-Thanet
Paralympic table tennis players of Great Britain
Paralympic medalists in table tennis
Paralympic bronze medalists for Great Britain
Table tennis players at the 2012 Summer Paralympics
Table tennis players at the 2016 Summer Paralympics
Table tennis players at the 2020 Summer Paralympics
Medalists at the 2012 Summer Paralympics
Medalists at the 2016 Summer Paralympics
Medalists at the 2020 Summer Paralympics
Commonwealth Games medallists in table tennis
Commonwealth Games gold medallists for England
Table tennis players at the 2018 Commonwealth Games
Medallists at the 2018 Commonwealth Games